Jane by Charlotte is a 2021 French docu-drama film directed by Charlotte Gainsbourg in her directorial debut. The film was shown in the Cannes Premiere section at the 2021 Cannes Film Festival.

Cast
 Charlotte Gainsbourg as herself
 Jane Birkin as herself

Box office
In France, the film earned $133,152 from 79 theaters in its opening weekend.

References

External links
 

2021 films
2021 documentary films
2021 drama films
French documentary films
2020s French-language films
Japanese documentary films
2020s Japanese-language films
2020s French films
2021 multilingual films
French multilingual films
Japanese multilingual films